Jordan Drew (born 26 January 1995) is a Canada international rugby league footballer who plays as a  and er for the Limoux Grizzlies in the Elite One Championship. 

He previously played for the Brisbane Broncos in the NRL.

Background
Drew was born in Brisbane, Queensland, Australia. He is of Canadian descent.

He played his junior rugby league for the Nanango Stags, before being signed by the Brisbane Broncos.

Playing career

Early career
From 2013 to 2015, Drew played for the Brisbane Broncos' NYC team.

2013
In Round 22 of the 2013 NRL season, Drew made his NRL debut for the Broncos against the St. George Illawarra Dragons, scoring a try on debut.

2015
On 2 May, Drew played for the Junior Kangaroos against the Junior Kiwis. On 8 July, he played for the Queensland under-20s team against the New South Wales under-20s team. On 14 September, he was named at centre in the 2015 NYC Team of the Year. On 20 October, he signed a 2-year contract with the Cronulla-Sutherland Sharks starting in 2016, after being released from the final year of his Broncos contract.

2017
On 23 June, Drew was granted a release from his Sharks' contract to join the Townsville Blackhawks mid-season. In his season and a half with Cronulla, he did not play a first grade game.

2018
Drew was selected to represent Canada for their 2021 Rugby League World Cup qualifying fixtures.

2019
After a season and a half with the Blackhawks, Drew joined the Wynnum Manly Seagulls for the 2019 Queensland Cup season.

2020
On 14 Aug 2020 it was reported that he had signed for the Limoux Grizzlies in the Elite One Championship.

International
He made his international début for Canada in the 8-38 loss to Jamaica on 13 November 2018.

References

External links
2015 Brisbane Broncos profile
NRL profile

1995 births
Living people
Australian people of Canadian descent
Australian rugby league players
Brisbane Broncos players
Canada national rugby league team players
Junior Kangaroos players
Limoux Grizzlies players
Rugby league centres
Rugby league fullbacks
Rugby league wingers
Rugby league players from Brisbane